Yabuta (written:  or ) is a Japanese surname. Notable people with the surname include:

, Japanese footballer
, Japanese baseball player
, Japanese long-distance runner

Japanese-language surnames